Catherine Palmer is an author.

Catherine Palmer may also refer to:

Catherine Palmer, character in Mercy (film)
Catherine Palmer, see North Devon Council election, 2003

See also
Kate Palmer, netball player
Katherine Van Winkle Palmer (1895-1982), paleontologist